Bojan Spasojević (born 18 January 1992) is a Serbian football forward who last played for Dinamo Vranje.

Club career
Born in Kosovska Mitrovica, Spasojević moved in Kragujevac as a kid and started playing football with football school "Fitness" at the age of 7. Later he played with local Erdoglija and Šumadija through his youth categories. After the fusion of two clubs, Spasojević made his senior debut for Šumadija 1903 at the age of 16. As a teenager, he signed a five-year contract with Javor Ivanjica, where he also spent a period with youth team. During the time he was under contract with Javor, Spasojević mostly spent as a loaned player with Sloga Petrovac na Mlavi, Šumadija Kragujevac, Kopaonik Brus and Tabane Trgovački. In the meantime, he made his Serbian SuperLiga debut in the 13th fixture match of the 2012–13 season, against Novi Pazar, played on 17 November 2012. After the end of contract, he played with Pobeda Beloševac, Arsenal Kragujevac and Vodojaža, where he was the best scorer with 17 goals in the first-half of the 2016–17 season. At the beginning of 2017, he joined Serbian First League side Dinamo Vranje. Spasojević left Dinamo after the end of a season, making single appearance in the First League.

References

External links
 Bojan Spasojević Stats at utakmica.rs 
 
 

1992 births
Living people
Sportspeople from Mitrovica, Kosovo
Association football forwards
Serbian footballers
FK Šumadija 1903 players
FK Javor Ivanjica players
FK Sloga Petrovac na Mlavi players
FK Dinamo Vranje players
Serbian SuperLiga players